Nigel Richard Clifford (born June 1959) is the President of the Royal Geographical Society, the Deputy Chair of the UK's Geospatial Commission, and Operating Executive for Marlin Equity Partners. He formerly held several chief executive and senior positions, mainly in technology companies. He has also been chief executive of Great Britain's Ordnance Survey and Glasgow Royal Infirmary NHS Trust.

Early life
Nigel Clifford was born in June 1959. He has a degree from Downing College, Cambridge in Geography and an MBA from the University of Strathclyde.

Career
He worked for British Telecom in a variety of roles from 1981 to 1992. He was chief executive of Glasgow Royal Infirmary NHS Trust from 1992 to 1998. From 1998 to 2000 he was service delivery director at Cable & Wireless plc. He was chief executive of Tertio from 2000 to 2005.

From 2005 to 2008 he was chief executive of Symbian Ltd. (a joint venture of handset vendors) which was eventually sold and integrated into Nokia in 2008. He was technology director at Nokia from 2008 to 2010 and chief executive of Micro Focus International from 2010 to 2011. He was CEO of Procserve, a cloud based e-commerce network, from 2012 to 2015.

He has held non-executive director positions at Anite, and Alliance Pharma.

He was chief executive officer of Ordnance Survey, a British government-owned mapping business, from June 2015 for three years.

He is currently President of the Royal Geographical Society.

Professional memberships
CGeog – Chartered Geographer, Royal Geographical Society
FRICS – Fellow of the Royal Institute of Chartered SurveyorsFRGS - Fellow of Royal Geographical SocietyFRSA - Fellow of The Royal Society of ArtsFCMI - Fellow of the Chartered Management Institute

Personal life
He is married and has three adult children. His personal interests include fell-walking, running, and kayaking.

References

Living people
1959 births
British chief executives
Presidents of the Royal Geographical Society
Alumni of Downing College, Cambridge
Alumni of the University of Strathclyde
People educated at The Portsmouth Grammar School
British Telecom people
National Health Service people